Rahbat is a town in the Batna Province of north-eastern Algeria.

communes of Batna Province
Cities in Algeria
Algeria